The 2014 BYU Cougars football team represented Brigham Young University in the 2014 NCAA Division I FBS football season. The Cougars, led by tenth head coach Bronco Mendenhall, played their home games at LaVell Edwards Stadium. This was the fourth year BYU competed as an independent. They finished the season 8–5. They were invited to the inaugural Miami Beach Bowl where they lost to Memphis.

Before the season
After a season in which the entire offensive staff was changed, BYU is expected to have stability in the coaching ranks as every coach is expected to return.

2014 Recruits
The Cougars have signed 17 high school seniors, 2 junior college transfers, and 2 FBS transfer for the 2014 class. A few members will be going straight out onto their LDS mission. Details on each signee will be added within the next couple of weeks. The class includes 12 defensive and eight offensive players representing seven different states with seven recruits signing out of California, four from Utah, three from Texas, two from both Arizona and Kansas, and one each from Alabama and North Carolina. On defense, BYU adds six recruits at defensive line, three at linebacker and three in the defensive backfield, while signing four wide receivers, three offensive linemen and one tight end on offense. BYU also has two mid-year enrollees that will bolster their ranks.

2014 Returning Missionaries
18 return missionaries will join BYU for the 2014 season.

2014 Departures
5 BYU players were invited to the 2014 NFL Scouting Combine and will not return as they are graduating seniors. The five feature two of BYU's all-time leaders in Kyle Van Noy and Cody Hoffman. Uani Unga, Eathyn Manumaleuna, and Daniel Sorensen round out the list of Cougars invited to the Combine. All five are expected to be taken in the 2014 NFL Draft. Only 13 programs had more than BYU's 5-players invited to the Combine, and out of those 13 only 3 had more than BYU's defense: Alabama, Florida State, and Florida.

Media

Football Media Day
Football Media Day is scheduled to take place in June 2014 and will air live on BYUtv and have player interviews conducted through byutvsports.com.

Cougar IMG Sports Network Affiliates

KSL 102.7 FM and 1160 AM- Flagship Station (Salt Lake City/ Provo, UT and ksl.com)BYU Radio- Nationwide (Dish Network 980, Sirius XM 143, and byuradio.org)KIDO- Boise, ID [football only]KTHK- Blackfoot/ Idaho Falls/ Pocatello/ Rexburg, IDKMGR- Manti, UTKSUB- Cedar City, UTKDXU- St. George, UTKSHP- Las Vegas, NV [football only]BYUCougars.com

Roster

Schedule
The 2014 schedule featured a lot of returning opponents in Texas, Houston, Virginia, UCF, Boise State, Utah State, Middle Tennessee, and Nevada. While it was not regarded as being as difficult as the 2013 schedule, it was the first schedule that played in every major recruiting state BYU target: Texas, Florida, and California. They played in the 2014 Miami Beach Bowl.

Game summaries

UConn

Sources:

Uniform combination: white helmet, white jersey, blue pants.
For the second consecutive season BYU opened up on the East Coast. This time they came not in a white-out fashion. Instead they came with a mixed white and blue uniform, and the lack of rainy conditions allowed BYU to strike early and often in the running game.

BYU would rush for 205 yards and two touchdowns, while Taysom Hill would complete nearly 80% of his passes for 308 yards. While BYU sat out many players due to suspensions, including top Running back Jamaal Williams, BYU's defense kept UConn in must pass situations as they limited UConn's rushing game to 94 yards on31 carries, an average of 2.3 per play.

BYU would walk away with a 1–0 start, but they would also walk away with 2 of the 3 FBS Independent player of the week awards. Taysom Hill would take his first FBS Offensive Player of the Week award, and Bronson Kaufusi would take the FBS Defensive Player of the Week award.

Game Stats: 
Passing: BYU, Taysom Hill 28-36-0-308; UConn, Casey Cochran 17-31-1-171, Chandler Whitmer 8-17-0-113.
Rushing: BYU, Hill 12–98–2, Paul Lasike 9–49, Algernon Brown 6–35, Adam Hine 6–15, Mitchell Juergens 1–5, Nate Carter 3–4; UConn, Max Delorenzo 9–40, Josh Marriner 9–28–1, Arkeel Newsome 3–10, Ron Johnson 3–9, Blake Feagles 1–6, Cochran 1-(−6), Whitmer 5-(−13). 
Receiving: BYU, Mitch Mathews 5–62–1, Terenn Houk 4–58–1, Colby Pearson 3–47, Brown 4–44, Adam hine 3–25, Lasike 4–23, Jordan Leslie 2–22, Mitchell Huergens 2–19, Devin Mahina 1–8; UConn, Geremy Davis 7–96, Kamal Abrams 3–38, Sean Mcquillan 3–33, Alec Bloom 2–24, Noel Thomas 2–18, Newsome 1–18, Marriner 1–17, Johnson 1–11, Deshon Foxx 2–8, Jazzmar Clax 1–3, Tommy Myers 1–3.
Interceptions: BYU, Craig Bills 1–0.

Texas

Sources:

Uniform combination: white helmet, white jersey, blue pants.
Texas quarterback Tyrone Swoopes got his first collegiate start for the injured David Ash, who would later retire from collegiate football, and a lot of short passes allowed him to walk away with a high passing percentage. While Texas found itself unable to score often offensively, the defense pestered BYU and kept the game close until the third quarter.

BYU took the ball to open the third quarter and drove for a touchdown. Texas turnovers and an inability to stop BYU in the third turned a close game into a blowout. BYU converted four possessions into four touchdowns ad turned a 6–0 game into 34–0 before Texas was finally able to score.

The highlight of the night came in the third when Taysom Hill took off for a 30-yard touchdown run with a little over 12 minutes remaining in the third. During the run he leaped six feet in the air over one Texas defender. The highlight placed Hill on many people's Heisman watch list and caused Cougar fans to start calling Taysom Taysman.

The Cougars third quarter performance turned what had been a lackluster performance into a blowout and was enough to give Taysom Hill his second consecutive FBS Independent Offisive Player of the Week award. Meanwhile, many Texas fans started claiming they never wanted to see BYU on their schedule again. BYU improved to 4–1 vs. Texas and 6–1 vs. Texas & Oklahoma lifetime with their second consecutive blowout.

Game Stats: 
Passing: BYU, Taysom Hill 18-27-1-181; UT, Tyrone Swoopes 20-31-1-176.
Rushing: BYU, Hill 24–99–3, Jamaal Williams 19–89, Adam Hine 4–29–2, Algernon Brown 6–29, Nate Carter 2–4, Paul Lasike 1–2; UT, Johnathan Gray 14–47, Malcolm Brown 14–28, Swoopes 7–7.
Receiving: BYU, Jordan Leslie 7–85, Brown 4–40, Mitch Mathews 4–24, Terenn Houk 1–14, Williams 1–12, Devin Mahine 1–6; UT, John Harris 8–77–1, Jaxon Shipley 5–36, Lorenzo Joe 1–22, Marcus Johnson 2–20, Geoff Swaim 2–14, Gray 1–5, Brown 1–2.
Interceptions: BYU, Michael Alisa 1–30; UT, Quandre Diggs 1–0.

Houston

Sources:

Uniform combination: white helmet with stars and stripes, blue jersey, white pants.
On 9/11 both BYU and Houston came out with patriotic helmets, and BYU decorated the field with patriotic symbols to remind everyone we never forget what happened on 9–11. The decorations served only as a small distraction as a game was to take place.

BYU and Houston both swapped quarters in terms of offensive efficiency. For the game BYU owned most statistical categories. However Houston was able to keep it close due to turnovers. Houston forced 3 turnovers which they converted into 17 points, 14 of which came in the second quarter and turned a 23–0 game into 23–15 as time expired in the first half.

BYU countered by opening the game with a defensive safety on Houston's first possession. In addition to the turnovers, personal fouls kept a lot of Houston drives alive. BYU committed 11 penalties for 98 yards.

The close game led a lot of people to speculate BYU wasn't truly a top 25 team. However some of the doubters were silenced when Taysom Hill was awarded his third consecutive FBS Independents Offensive player of the week award.

Game Stats: 
Passing: UH, John O'Korn 30-52-0-307, Greg Ward Jr. 1–1–0–8; BYU, Taysom Hill 21-34-2-200.
Rushing: UH, Kenneth Farrow 3–7, O'Korn 6–4, Ward 1–0, Ryan Jackson 3-(−1); BYU, Taysom Hill 26–160–1, Jamaal Williams 28–139–2, Paul Lasike 3–21, Adam Hine 3–7, Scott Arellano 1-(−1).
Receiving: UH, Daniel Spencer 10–133–1, Deontay Greenberry 6–74–2, Kenneth Farrow 5–25, Markeith Ambles 3–32, Ward 3–24, Demarcus Ayers 1–14, Wayne Beadle 1–9, Jackson 2–4; BYU, Jordan Leslie 6–79, Mitchell Juergens 1–38, Mitch Mathews 4–22–1, Devin Mahina 1–16, Kurt Henderson 1–11, Williams 1–9, Lasike 2–8, Terenn Houk 1–7, Adam Hine 1–5, Trey Dye 2–4, Devon Blackmon 1–1.
Interceptions: UH, Joey Mbu 1–0, Trevon Stewart 1–0.

Virginia

Sources:

Uniform combination: white helmet, white jersey, white pants.
Virginia entered the game leading the nation in forcing turnovers. They were unable to take the ball once from BYU. However, the Cavaliers were able to limit BYU's offensive possessions. The Cavaliers doubled up BYU in almost every statistical category.

Virginia ran 102 plays to BYU's 60, held the ball 41 minutes to BYU's 19, and outgained BYU 519 yards to 332. However BYU was able to score on virtually every possession they had, and a 99-yard punt return from Adam Hine proved to be the backbreaker for the Cavaliers as BYU improved to 4–0.

For the fourth consecutive week Taysom Hill walked away with the FBS Independents offensive player of the week award, and Scott Arellano, who was awarded the game MVP thanks to his punts of 60+ yards, walked away with the FBS Independents special teams player of the week award.

Game Stats:
Passing: VA, Greyson Lambert 21-35-1-188, Matt Johns 14-23-0-139; BYU, Taysom Hill 13-23-0-187.
Rushing: VA, Khalek Shepherd 14–73–1, Lambert 5–49–1, Kevin Parks 11–24, Johns 3–22, Taquan Mizzell 8–17, Darius Jennings 3–11; BYU, Hill 17–72–1, Jamaal Williams 13–68–1, Paul Lasike 2–5, Mitchell Juergens 1–3, Adam Hine 1–0, TEAM 3-(−3).
Receiving: VA, Miles Gooch 6–65, Parks 6–33, Canaan Severin 4–58, Andre Levrone 3–46, Doni Dowling 4–36, Jennings 3–35, Keeon Johnson 3–21, Kyle Dockins 1–11, Mizzell 2–10, Rob Burns 1–8, Shepherd 2–4; BYU, Devon Blackmon 2–55, Mitch Juergens 2–53–1, Jordan Leslie 4–41–1, Mitch Mathews 3–26, Terenn Houk 1–8, Devin Mahina 1–4.
Interceptions: BYU, Robertson Daniels 1–32.

Utah State

Sources:

Uniform combination: white helmet with royal blue decals and royal blue chromium facemasks, royal blue jersey, royal blue pants.
With no Utah on the schedule, BYU choose the Utah State game to break out the royal blue uniforms. The day also featured the retirement of Jim McMahon's #9 into the Cougar Ring of Fame, making BYU's WR Jordan Leslie the last Cougar to wear the coveted number.

The night began with two pass completions from Taysom Hill to Jordan Leslie totaling 57 yards, setting up a 7-yard run touchdown run from Taysom Hill. Utah State countered by converting linebacker Nick Vigil into a running back.  Nick used strong runs around the outside to continually move the ball into BYU territory and give Utah State the short field. Meanwhile, Darrell Garretson completed a QB rating above 230 as Utah State used long, sustained offensive drives to limit BYU's possessions.

A Jamaal Williams fumble in the second quarter allowed the Aggies to take a 21–14 lead. The fumble was the first lost fumble for Williams collegiate career. The fumble began a series of bad stretches for BYU as on the next possession Taysom Hill suffered what appeared to be a fractured leg. Hill was carted off the field and placed in an air cast. Early prognosis stated that is might be season ending, but additional details would be released Monday after X-Rays and an MRI were performed. Backup quarterback Christian Stewart came in to try and rally the BYU cause, but 3 interceptions allowed the Aggies to utilize a short field and ruin any real chances BYU had of coming back.

The loss to Utah State proved to be the first home loss for BYU against the Aggies since 1976. It ended any chances BYU had of making a New Years Six bowl and likely ended any Heisman Campaign Hill was to possibly have. Ironically enough, the last time BYU had lost to the Aggies at home was when Jim McMahon was a QB for BYU.

The loss returned the Wagon Wheel to Logan and allowed Utah State to walk away with the 2014 Beehive Boot, as neither team plays Utah this season.

Game Stats: 
Passing: USU, Darrell Garretson 19-25-0-321; BYU, Christian Stewart 10-29-3-172, Taysom Hill 8–11–0–99.
Rushing: USU, Nick Vigil 16–57–1, Joe Hill 18–54, Rashad Hall 7–10, Kennedy Williams 2–10, LaJuan Hunt 3–8, JoJo Natson 1–6, Garretson 3-(−9); BYU, Jamaal Williams 17–99, Taysom Hill 7–35–1, Christian Stewart 7–11, Paul Lasike 2–6, Algernon Brown 1–3.
Receiving: USU, Hunter Sharp 5–173–1, Devon Robinson 6–98–2, JoJo Natson 5–34, Joe Hill 2–11, Ronald Butler 1–5; BYU, Mitch Mathews 8–117–1, Jordan Leslie 4–135, Terenn Houk 3–7, Lasike 1–7, Adam Hine 1–4, Williams 1–1.
Interceptions: USU, Devin Centers 1–34, Frank Sutera 1–21, Torrey Green 1–0.

UCF

Sources:

Uniform combination: white helmet, white jersey, blue pants.
Christian Stewart started his first game for BYU at QB hoping to help BYU rebound. The Cougars entered the game with only 2 days of practice to get ready for the Knights and with 5 starters out with injury (Taysom Hill, Brayden Kearsley, Terenn Houk, Alan Fui, and Devin Leavitt). The injuries to Kearsley & Houk allowed UCF's defense to break through the line and pester BYU throughout, sacking Stewart twice forcing one fumble and picking the ball off once. BYU's defense rose to the challenge and was able to stop UCF's offense from scoring on 8 consecutive possessions. The defense picked off two UCF passes and forced two UCF fumbles, allowing BYU to have the short field and take the lead in the third quarter. BYU's defense also forced UCF into two missed field goals in the fourth, forcing the eventual overtime.

Injuries proved once again to be BYU's downfall. Jamaal Williams suffered an ankle injury on the first play of the game, Cornerback Jordan Johnson was carted off the field and taken to a local hospital to have his right arm evaluated, and Craig Bills went out of the game with a concussion. BYU also revealed that receiver Nick Kurtz will seek a redshirt this season and won't play in any of the remaining games.

A conservative rush attack in the fourth quarter forced BYU into 4 consecutive three-and-outs, and UCF won 31–24.

Game Stats: 
Passing: BYU, Christian Stewart 22-37-1-153; UCF, Justin Holman 30-51-2-326.
Rushing: BYU, Algernon Brown 16–80, Stewart 13–52, Paul Lasike 12–51, Adam Hine 5–5, Mitch Juergens 1–2, Jamaal Williams 1–1, Team 1-(−2); UCF, William Stanback 22–44–1, Holman 10–26–1, Team 1-(−7).
Receiving: BYU, Devin Mahina 4–46–2, Mitch Mathews 3–24, Colby Pearson 3–22–1, Jordan Leslie 4–21, Lasike 1–19, Juergens 3–14, Brown 2–6, Keanu Nelson 1–3, Hine 1-(−2); UCF, Josh Reese 5–87–1, Breshad Perriman 6–83, Rannell Hall 8–71, J.J. Worton 3–22, Stanback 2–18–1, Justin Tukes 3–15, Jordan Akins 1–14, Jackie Williams 1–10, Kevin Miller 1–6.
Interceptions: BYU, Kai Nacua 1–15, Skye Povey 1–15; UCF, Jacoby Glenn 1–0.

Nevada

Sources:

Uniform combination: white helmet, blue jersey, white pants.
For the second consecutive game Christian Stewart had one quarter where he was on fire, passing for more than 150 yards in the second quarter and throwing for three touchdowns. However Cody Fajardo rebounded from a slow first half to throw for more than 200 of his 285 yards passing in the second half. Nevada was also able to get a running game going in the second half thanks to Don Jackson, who carried 18 times for 62 yards, and the Wolf Pack rallied to hand BYU their third straight loss and second consecutive fourth quarter loss. BYU had the chance with under 2 minutes to tie the game up, but a late fumble at the Nevada 34 yard line, the second fumble within three possessions, sealed the win for the Wolf Pack. It was both fumbles that proved to be the difference in the game. BYU fumbled the ball 3 times, two of which led to Nevada touchdowns. The third allowed Nevada to kneel and run out the clock.

Game Stats: 
Passing: UNR, Cody Fajardo 26-40-0-285; BYU, Christian Stewart 39-36-0-408.
Rushing: UNR, Don Jackson 3–95, Jarred Gipson 4–61, Richy Turner 9–56–1, Hans Henderson 6–47, Kendall Brook 3–21, James Butler 1–5; BYU, Nate Carter 7–87, Christian Stewart 16–47, Paul Lasike 12–46–1, Algernon Brown 1–11, Mitch Juergens 1–5, Jordan Leslie 1–1, Terenn Houk 1-(−4).
Receiving: UNR, Don Jackson 18–62, Cody Fajardo 8–47–2, James Butler 9–19–2; BYU, Mitch Mathews 16–182–2, Paul Lasike 5–69–1, Jordan Leslie 6–47, Mitch Juergens 4–41, Devin Mahina 2–19, Keanu Nelson 2–13–1, Colby Pearson 1–13, Algernon Brown 1–11, Terenn Houk 1–9, Trey Dye 1–4.

Boise State

Sources:

After four consecutive games where BYU gave up more than 400 yards Bronco Mendenhall took over the defensive playing calling responsibilities. The change in play calling didn't faze Boise State. BYU gave up 9 plays of 15+ yards passing and another 4 against the rush. Boise State would win the turnover battle 2 to 1, and while the Cougars limited their turnovers Boise State would score touchdowns off of both of BYU's turnovers. Jamaal Williams returned and once again assumed the mantle of top running back, but even his spark and a 19-yard touchdown run couldn't help the Cougar D stop the big plays.

BYU's defense gave their offense many opportunities and scored nine points themselves, but ten times Boise's defense held BYU to four or fewer plays. In the end Boise State controlled the ball 13 more minutes than BYU and drove down the field six times for 60 or more yards to pull away from BYU. The fourth consecutive loss for BYU gave the Cougars their first four-game losing streak since 2010 and gave the Cougars their first winless October since 1993.

Uniform combination: white helmet, white jersey, blue pants.

Game Stats: 
Passing: BYU, Christian Stewart 22-38-1-259; BSU, Grant Hedrick 24-31-1-410.
Rushing: BYU, Jamaal Williams 16–70–1, Paul Lasike 3–4, Nate Carter 1–0, Christian Stewart 6-(−11); BSU, Jay Ajayi 26–118–2, Jeremy McNichols 4–32, Devan Demas 6–32, Grant Hedrick 8–29–1, Ryan Finley 1–21, Chaz Anderson 1-(−1), Team 2-(−4).
Receiving: BYU, Colby Pearson 5–109–1, Jordan Leslie 5–34, Mitch Mathews 4–54, Paul Lasike 3–29, Jamaal Williams 3–1, Mitch Juergens 1–23, Terenn Houk 1–5, Devin Mahina 1–4; BSU, Thomas Sperbeck 6–148–1, Shane Williams-Rhodes 6–89–1, Chaz Anderson 3–78, Jeremy McNichols 2–26, Jay Ajayi 2–26, Jake Roh 2–14–1, Troy Ware 1–19–1, Dallas Burroughs 1–6, Holden Huff 1–4.
Interceptions: BYU, Fred Warner 1–20–1; BSU, Darian Thompson 1–2.

Middle Tennessee

Sources:

Uniform combination: white helmet, white jersey, blue pants
After a four-game losing streak the Cougars headed to Murfreesboro, TN to play their coldest game of the year to date. The wind caused both teams to focus on a run first attack during most of the first half, and the Cougars ended up paying the price when junior running back Jamaal Williams suffered a season ending knee injury. With Williams out the Cougars let Stewart start to pass more frequently. The result was Stewart's third consecutive game with more than 300 yards passing, his first game with no turnovers, and BYU ended the four game losing streak. The win became Stewart's first win as BYU's starting QB.

Game Stats: 
Passing: BYU, Christian Stewart 28-45-0-316; MT, Austin Grammer 16-32-2-119.
Rushing: BYU, Jamaal Williams 16–49, Paul Lasike 5–28–1, Nate Carter 5–24, Adam Hine 3–25, Christian Stewart 7–5–1, Mitch Juergens 1–5, Team 2-(−8); MT, Shane Tucker 10–49, Jordan Parker 7–32, Reggie Whatley 6–24, AJ Erdely 2–7, Austin Grammer 12-(−3).
Receiving: BYU, Mitch Mathews 6–60, Devin Mahina 4–40, Paul Lasike 4–22, Colby Pearson 3–45–1, Jordan Leslie 3–33–1, Terenn Houk 2–28, Jamaal Williams 2–24, Mitch Juergens 2–12, Kurt Henderson 1–33, Keanu Nelson 1–19; MT, Marcus Henry 5–33, Devin Clarke 3–43, Shane Tucker 2–14, Chris Perkins 2–11, D Frazier 2-(−1), Tyler Barron 1–11, Shannon Smith 1–8.
Interceptions: BYU, Jordan Praetor 1–0, Tomasi Laulile 1–0.

UNLV

Sources:

Uniform combination: black helmet with royal blue decals and black facemasks, black jersey, black pants
The Rebels surprised BYU by shutting down their running game in the first half. Accompanied by two first half turnovers, the Rebels were able to keep the game close. However BYU let Stewart fly free in the third quarter. Stewart did his best Taysom Hill impression to avoid being sacked multiple times. For the second consecutive game he threw no interceptions and for the fourth straight game he threw over 300 yards. The result was BYU pulling away for the win. After the game BYU officially accepted a bowl invitation to the Miami Beach Bowl. The key difference in the game was red/blue zone efficiency. BYU went 4/4 with four touchdowns. UNLV went 2/2, but both times they were forced to field goals. Had they capitalized these chances into touchdowns, the first half would have been a very different story.

Game Stats: 
Passing: UNLV, Blake Decker 10–25–1–90, Jared Lebowitz 10-20-0-114; BYU, Christian Stewart 18-32-0-325.
Rushing: UNLV, Shaquielle Murray-Lawrence 20–143–1, Keith Whitely 13–51, Blake Decker 7–8, Marcus Sullivan 2–1, Jared Lebowitz 3-(−4); BYU, Paul Lasike 8–70–2, Nate Carter 7–55, Adam Hine 8–45, Christian Stewart 6–38, Jordan Leslie 2–33–1, Algernon Brown 6–32, Trey Dye 1-(−2).
Receiving: UNLV, Devonte Boyd 5–70–1, Devante Davis 5–51, Keith Whitely 4–48, Maika Mataele 2–10, Shaquielle Murray Lawrence 2–8, Kendal Keys 1–11, Marcus Sullivan 1–6; BYU, Mitch Mathews 6–120–1, Jordan Leslie 5–68, Terenn Houk 2–38, Colby Pearson 1–34, Paul Lasike 1–26–1, Devin Mahina 1–15–1, Ross Apo 1–13, Mitch Juergens 1–11.
Interceptions: BYU, Kai Nacua 1–32.

Savannah State

Sources:

Uniform combination: white helmet, blue jersey, white pants

Game Stats: 
Passing: SSU, Leon Prunty 10–25–1–40, Michael Knox 0–3–0–0; BYU, Christian Stewart 12-17-0-196, McCoy Hill 2–2–0–27.
Rushing: SSU, Michael Knox 3–14, Richard Williams II 6–12, Nicholas Bentley 3–7, Anthony Criswell 3–5, Alex Simmons 2–31, Stephen Reynolds 1–0, Leon Prunty 4-(−5); BYU, Nate Carter 20–116–1, AJ Moore 10–62–1, Christian Stewart 5–44–2, Hunter Moore 7–30, McCoy Hill 5–27, Algernon Brown 2–17, Adam Hine 4–9, Paul Lasike 3–8, Toloa Ho Ching 1–0.
Receiving: SSU, Jeremiah Harris 4–17, Kris Drummond 2–6, Dereon London 1–11, Keynnard Campbell 1–5, Jaylen McGriff 1–2, Steven Hagan 1-(−1); BYU, Mitch Mathews 4–110–2, Jordan Leslie 3–36–1, Devin Mahina 2–32, Terenn Houk 2–12–1, Mitch Juergens 1–19, Nate Carter 1–8, Paul Lasike 1–6.
Interceptions: BYU, Alani Fua 1–20.

Cal

Sources:

Uniform combination: white helmet, white jersey, blue pants

Game Stats: 
Passing: BYU, Christian Stewart 23-38-1-433; CAL, Jared Goff 38-60-1-393.
Rushing: BYU, Paul Lasike 12–63–1, Algernon Brown 11–38, Adam Hine 3–20, Team 2-(−2), Christian Stewart 11-(−12); CAL, Daniel Lasco 26–130, Jared Goff 7–23, Tre Watson 5–18–1, Vic Enwere 2–3, Luke Rubenzer 1(−1).
Receiving: BYU, Mitch Juergens 7–107–2, Devon Blackmon 6–60, Jordan Leslie 5–155–2, Algernon Brown 2–31–1, Mitch Mathews 1–39, Paul Lasike 1–28, Terenn Houk 1–13; CAL, Kenny Lawler 12–138–3, Chris Harper 8–98, Bryce Treggs 6–51, Maurice Harris 3–28, Daniel Lasco 3–13, Stephen Anderson 2–30, Trevor Davis 2–22–1, Matt Rockett 2–13.
Interceptions: BYU, Skye Povey 1–27; CAL, Caleb Coleman 1–4.

Miami Beach Bowl

Sources:

Uniform combination: white helmet, white jersey, white pants

Game Stats: 
Passing: BYU, Christian Stewart 23-48-3-348; MEM, Paxton Lynch 24-46-3-306.
Rushing: BYU, Algernon Brown 19–79, Paul Lasike 7–11–2, Mitch Juergens 1–3, Adam Hine 3–0, Team 1-(−5), Christian Stewart 11-(−11); MEM, Brandon Haynes 22–49, Keiwone Malone 2–41, Paxton Lynch 13–38–3, Sam Craft 7–28, Jarvis Cooper 5–18, Mose Frazier 1–1, Team 1-(−1).
Receiving: BYU, Mitch Mathews 9–82–1, Mitch Juergens 4–87–1, Devin Mahina 2–54, Terenn Houk 2–42, Jordan Leslie 1–23–1, Paul Lasike 1–19, Devon Blackmon 1–14, Adam Hine 1–11, Keanu Nelson 1–9, Algernon Brown 1–7; MEM, Keiwone Malone 6–75–2, Brandon Hayes 4–35, Mose Frazier 4–31, Alan Cross 3–69–1, Phil Mayhue 2–23, Daniel Montiel 2–17, Rod Proctor 2–14–1, Joe Craig 1–42.
Interceptions: BYU, Alani Fua 1–37, Zac Stout 1–19–1, Manoa Pikula 1–2; MEM, Derek Howard 1–2, DeShaughn Terry 1–0, Bobby McCain 1-(−2).

Rankings

References

BYU
BYU Cougars football seasons
BYU Cougars football